The Gans Baronetcy, of The Netherlands, was a title in the Baronetage of England.  It was created on 29 June 1682 for Cornelius Gans, with remainder to a Stephen Groulart.  However, nothing further is known of the baronetcy.

Gans baronets, of The Netherlands (1682)
Sir Cornelius Gans, 1st Baronet (died )

References

Extinct baronetcies in the Baronetage of England
Baronetcies created with special remainders